An optical fiber, or optical fibre in Commonwealth English, is a flexible, transparent fiber made by drawing glass (silica) or plastic to a diameter slightly thicker than that of a human hair. Optical fibers are used most often as a means to transmit light between the two ends of the fiber and find wide usage in fiber-optic communications, where they permit transmission over longer distances and at higher bandwidths (data transfer rates) than electrical cables. Fibers are used instead of metal wires because signals travel along them with less loss; in addition, fibers are immune to electromagnetic interference, a problem from which metal wires suffer. Fibers are also used for illumination and imaging, and are often wrapped in bundles so they may be used to carry light into, or images out of confined spaces, as in the case of a fiberscope. Specially designed fibers are also used for a variety of other applications, some of them being fiber optic sensors and fiber lasers.

Optical fibers typically include a core surrounded by a transparent cladding material with a lower index of refraction. Light is kept in the core by the phenomenon of total internal reflection which causes the fiber to act as a waveguide. Fibers that support many propagation paths or transverse modes are called multi-mode fibers, while those that support a single mode are called single-mode fibers (SMF). Multi-mode fibers generally have a wider core diameter and are used for short-distance communication links and for applications where high power must be transmitted.

Being able to join optical fibers with low loss is important in fiber optic communication. This is more complex than joining electrical wire or cable and involves careful cleaving of the fibers, precise alignment of the fiber cores, and the coupling of these aligned cores. For applications that demand a permanent connection a fusion splice is common. In this technique, an electric arc is used to melt the ends of the fibers together. Another common technique is a mechanical splice, where the ends of the fibers are held in contact by mechanical force. Temporary or semi-permanent connections are made by means of specialized optical fiber connectors.

The field of applied science and engineering concerned with the design and application of optical fibers is known as fiber optics. The term was coined by Indian-American physicist Narinder Singh Kapany.

History 

Daniel Colladon and Jacques Babinet first demonstrated the guiding of light by refraction, the principle that makes fiber optics possible, in Paris in the early 1840s. John Tyndall included a demonstration of it in his public lectures in London, 12 years later. Tyndall also wrote about the property of total internal reflection in an introductory book about the nature of light in 1870:

In the late 19th century, a team of Viennese doctors guided light through bent glass rods to illuminate body cavities. Practical applications such as close internal illumination during dentistry followed, early in the twentieth century. Image transmission through tubes was demonstrated independently by the radio experimenter Clarence Hansell and the television pioneer John Logie Baird in the 1920s. In the 1930s, Heinrich Lamm showed that one could transmit images through a bundle of unclad optical fibers and used it for internal medical examinations, but his work was largely forgotten.

In 1953, Dutch scientist  first demonstrated image transmission through bundles of optical fibers with a transparent cladding. That same year, Harold Hopkins and Narinder Singh Kapany at Imperial College in London succeeded in making image-transmitting bundles with over 10,000 fibers, and subsequently achieved image transmission through a 75 cm long bundle which combined several thousand fibers. The first practical fiber optic semi-flexible gastroscope was patented by Basil Hirschowitz, C. Wilbur Peters, and Lawrence E. Curtiss, researchers at the University of Michigan, in 1956. In the process of developing the gastroscope, Curtiss produced the first glass-clad fibers; previous optical fibers had relied on air or impractical oils and waxes as the low-index cladding material.

Kapany coined the term fiber optics after writing a 1960 article in Scientific American that introduced the topic to a wide audience. He subsequently wrote the first book about the new field.

The first working fiber-optic data transmission system was demonstrated by German physicist Manfred Börner at Telefunken Research Labs in Ulm in 1965, followed by the first patent application for this technology in 1966. In 1968, NASA used fiber optics in the television cameras that were sent to the moon. At the time, the use in the cameras was classified confidential, and employees handling the cameras had to be supervised by someone with an appropriate security clearance.

Charles K. Kao and George A. Hockham of the British company Standard Telephones and Cables (STC) were the first to promote the idea that the attenuation in optical fibers could be reduced below 20 decibels per kilometer (dB/km), making fibers a practical communication medium, in 1965. They proposed that the attenuation in fibers available at the time was caused by impurities that could be removed, rather than by fundamental physical effects such as scattering. They correctly and systematically theorized the light-loss properties for optical fiber and pointed out the right material to use for such fibers—silica glass with high purity. This discovery earned Kao the Nobel Prize in Physics in 2009. The crucial attenuation limit of 20 dB/km was first achieved in 1970 by researchers Robert D. Maurer, Donald Keck, Peter C. Schultz, and Frank Zimar working for American glass maker Corning Glass Works. They demonstrated a fiber with 17 dB/km attenuation by doping silica glass with titanium. A few years later they produced a fiber with only 4 dB/km attenuation using germanium dioxide as the core dopant.

Initially, high-quality optical fibers could only be manufactured at 2 meters per second. Chemical engineer Thomas Mensah joined Corning in 1983 and increased the speed of manufacture to over 50 meters per second, making optical fiber cables cheaper than traditional copper ones. These innovations ushered in the era of optical fiber telecommunication.

The Italian research center CSELT worked with Corning to develop practical optical fiber cables, resulting in the first metropolitan fiber optic cable being deployed in Turin in 1977. CSELT also developed an early technique for splicing optical fibers, called Springroove.

Two teams, led by David N. Payne of the University of Southampton and Emmanuel Desurvire at Bell Labs, developed the erbium-doped fiber amplifier, which reduced the cost of long-distance fiber systems by reducing or eliminating optical-electrical-optical repeaters, in 1986 and 1987 respectively.

The emerging field of photonic crystals led to the development in 1991 of photonic-crystal fiber, which guides light by diffraction from a periodic structure, rather than by total internal reflection. The first photonic crystal fibers became commercially available in 2000. Photonic crystal fibers can carry higher power than conventional fibers and their wavelength-dependent properties can be manipulated to improve performance.

Uses

Communication 

Optical fiber is used as a medium for telecommunication and computer networking because it is flexible and can be bundled as cables. It is especially advantageous for long-distance communications, because infrared light propagates through the fiber with much lower attenuation compared to electricity in electrical cables. This allows long distances to be spanned with few repeaters.

10 or 40 Gbit/s is typical in deployed systems. 

Through the use of wavelength-division multiplexing (WDM), each fiber can carry many independent channels, each using a different wavelength of light. The net data rate (data rate without overhead bytes) per fiber is the per-channel data rate reduced by the forward error correction (FEC) overhead, multiplied by the number of channels (usually up to 80 in commercial dense WDM systems ). 

For short-distance applications, such as a network in an office building (see fiber to the office), fiber-optic cabling can save space in cable ducts. This is because a single fiber can carry much more data than electrical cables such as standard category 5 cable, which typically runs at 100 Mbit/s or 1 Gbit/s speeds.

Fibers are often also used for short-distance connections between devices. For example, most high-definition televisions offer a digital audio optical connection. This allows the streaming of audio over light, using the S/PDIF protocol over an optical TOSLINK connection.

Sensors 

Fibers have many uses in remote sensing. In some applications, the fiber itself is the sensor (the fibers channel optical light to a processing device that analyzes changes in the light's characteristics). In other cases, fiber is used to connect a sensor to a measurement system.

Optical fibers can be used as sensors to measure strain, temperature, pressure, and other quantities by modifying a fiber so that the property being measured modulates the intensity, phase, polarization, wavelength, or transit time of light in the fiber. Sensors that vary the intensity of light are the simplest since only a simple source and detector are required. A particularly useful feature of such fiber optic sensors is that they can, if required, provide distributed sensing over distances of up to one meter. Distributed acoustic sensing is one example of this.

In contrast, highly localized measurements can be provided by integrating miniaturized sensing elements with the tip of the fiber. These can be implemented by various micro- and nanofabrication technologies, such that they do not exceed the microscopic boundary of the fiber tip, allowing for such applications as insertion into blood vessels via hypodermic needle.

Extrinsic fiber optic sensors use an optical fiber cable, normally a multi-mode one, to transmit modulated light from either a non-fiber optical sensor—or an electronic sensor connected to an optical transmitter. A major benefit of extrinsic sensors is their ability to reach otherwise inaccessible places. An example is the measurement of temperature inside jet engines by using a fiber to transmit radiation into a pyrometer outside the engine. Extrinsic sensors can be used in the same way to measure the internal temperature of electrical transformers, where the extreme electromagnetic fields present make other measurement techniques impossible. Extrinsic sensors measure vibration, rotation, displacement, velocity, acceleration, torque, and torsion. A solid-state version of the gyroscope, using the interference of light, has been developed. The fiber optic gyroscope (FOG) has no moving parts and exploits the Sagnac effect to detect mechanical rotation.

Common uses for fiber optic sensors include advanced intrusion detection security systems. The light is transmitted along a fiber optic sensor cable placed on a fence, pipeline, or communication cabling, and the returned signal is monitored and analyzed for disturbances. This return signal is digitally processed to detect disturbances and trip an alarm if an intrusion has occurred.

Optical fibers are widely used as components of optical chemical sensors and optical biosensors.

Power transmission 
Optical fiber can be used to transmit power using a photovoltaic cell to convert the light into electricity. While this method of power transmission is not as efficient as conventional ones, it is especially useful in situations where it is desirable not to have a metallic conductor as in the case of use near MRI machines, which produce strong magnetic fields. Other examples are for powering electronics in high-powered antenna elements and measurement devices used in high-voltage transmission equipment.

Other uses 

Optical fibers are used as light guides in medical and other applications where bright light needs to be shone on a target without a clear line-of-sight path. Many microscopes use fiber-optic light sources to provide intense illumination of samples being studied.

Optical fiber is also used in imaging optics. A coherent bundle of fibers is used, sometimes along with lenses, for a long, thin imaging device called an endoscope, which is used to view objects through a small hole. Medical endoscopes are used for minimally invasive exploratory or surgical procedures. Industrial endoscopes (see fiberscope or borescope) are used for inspecting anything hard to reach, such as jet engine interiors. 

In some buildings, optical fibers route sunlight from the roof to other parts of the building (see nonimaging optics). Optical-fiber lamps are used for illumination in decorative applications, including signs, art, toys and artificial Christmas trees.  Optical fiber is an intrinsic part of the light-transmitting concrete building product LiTraCon.

Optical fiber can also be used in structural health monitoring. This type of sensor can detect stresses that may have a lasting impact on structures. It is based on the principle of measuring analog attenuation.

In spectroscopy, optical fiber bundles transmit light from a spectrometer to a substance that cannot be placed inside the spectrometer itself, in order to analyze its composition. A spectrometer analyzes substances by bouncing light off and through them. By using fibers, a spectrometer can be used to study objects remotely.

An optical fiber doped with certain rare-earth elements such as erbium can be used as the gain medium of a fiber laser or optical amplifier. Rare-earth-doped optical fibers can be used to provide signal amplification by splicing a short section of doped fiber into a regular (undoped) optical fiber line. The doped fiber is optically pumped with a second laser wavelength that is coupled into the line in addition to the signal wave. Both wavelengths of light are transmitted through the doped fiber, which transfers energy from the second pump wavelength to the signal wave. The process that causes the amplification is stimulated emission.

Optical fiber is also widely exploited as a nonlinear medium. The glass medium supports a host of nonlinear optical interactions, and the long interaction lengths possible in fiber facilitate a variety of phenomena, which are harnessed for applications and fundamental investigation. Conversely, fiber nonlinearity can have deleterious effects on optical signals, and measures are often required to minimize such unwanted effects.

Optical fibers doped with a wavelength shifter collect scintillation light in physics experiments.

Fiber-optic sights for handguns, rifles, and shotguns use pieces of optical fiber to improve the visibility of markings on the sight.

Principle of operation 

An optical fiber is a cylindrical dielectric waveguide (nonconducting waveguide) that transmits light along its axis through the process of total internal reflection. The fiber consists of a core surrounded by a cladding layer, both of which are made of dielectric materials. To confine the optical signal in the core, the refractive index of the core must be greater than that of the cladding. The boundary between the core and cladding may either be abrupt, in step-index fiber, or gradual, in graded-index fiber. Light can be fed into optical fibers using lasers or LEDs.

Fiber is immune to electrical interference; there is no cross-talk between signals in different cables and no pickup of environmental noise. Information traveling inside the optical fiber is even immune to electromagnetic pulses generated by nuclear devices.

Fiber cables do not conduct electricity, which makes fiber useful for protecting communications equipment in high voltage environments such as power generation facilities or applications prone to lightning strikes. The electrical isolation also prevents problems with ground loops. Because there is no electricity in optical cables that could potentially generate sparks, they can be used in environments where explosive fumes are present. Wiretapping (in this case, fiber tapping) is more difficult compared to electrical connections.

Fiber cables are not targeted for metal theft. In contrast, copper cable systems use large amounts of copper and have been targeted since the 2000s commodities boom.

Refractive index 
The refractive index is a way of measuring the speed of light in a material. Light travels fastest in a vacuum, such as in outer space. The speed of light in a vacuum is about 300,000 kilometers (186,000 miles) per second. The refractive index of a medium is calculated by dividing the speed of light in a vacuum by the speed of light in that medium. The refractive index of a vacuum is therefore 1, by definition. A typical single-mode fiber used for telecommunications has a cladding made of pure silica, with an index of 1.444 at 1500 nm, and a core of doped silica with an index around 1.4475. The larger the index of refraction, the slower light travels in that medium. From this information, a simple rule of thumb is that a signal using optical fiber for communication will travel at around 200,000 kilometers per second.

Total internal reflection 
When light traveling in an optically dense medium hits a boundary at a steep angle (larger than the critical angle for the boundary), the light is completely reflected. This is called total internal reflection. This effect is used in optical fibers to confine light in the core. Most modern optical fiber is weakly guiding, meaning that the difference in refractive index between the core and the cladding is very small (typically less than 1%). Light travels through the fiber core, bouncing back and forth off the boundary between the core and cladding. 

Because the light must strike the boundary with an angle greater than the critical angle, only light that enters the fiber within a certain range of angles can travel down the fiber without leaking out. This range of angles is called the acceptance cone of the fiber. There is a maximum angle from the fiber axis at which light may enter the fiber so that it will propagate, or travel, in the core of the fiber. The sine of this maximum angle is the numerical aperture (NA) of the fiber. Fiber with a larger NA requires less precision to splice and work with than fiber with a smaller NA. The size of this acceptance cone is a function of the refractive index difference between the fiber's core and cladding. Single-mode fiber has a small NA.

Multi-mode fiber 

Fiber with large core diameter (greater than 10 micrometers) may be analyzed by geometrical optics. Such fiber is called multi-mode fiber, from the electromagnetic analysis (see below). In a step-index multi-mode fiber, rays of light are guided along the fiber core by total internal reflection. Rays that meet the core-cladding boundary at an angle (measured relative to a line normal to the boundary) greater than the critical angle for this boundary, are completely reflected. The critical angle is determined by the difference in the index of refraction between the core and cladding materials. Rays that meet the boundary at a low angle are refracted from the core into the cladding where they terminate. The critical angle determines the acceptance angle of the fiber, often reported as a numerical aperture. A high numerical aperture allows light to propagate down the fiber in rays both close to the axis and at various angles, allowing efficient coupling of light into the fiber. However, this high numerical aperture increases the amount of dispersion as rays at different angles have different path lengths and therefore take different amounts of time to traverse the fiber.

In graded-index fiber, the index of refraction in the core decreases continuously between the axis and the cladding. This causes light rays to bend smoothly as they approach the cladding, rather than reflecting abruptly from the core-cladding boundary. The resulting curved paths reduce multi-path dispersion because high-angle rays pass more through the lower-index periphery of the core, rather than the high-index center. The index profile is chosen to minimize the difference in axial propagation speeds of the various rays in the fiber. This ideal index profile is very close to a parabolic relationship between the index and the distance from the axis.

Single-mode fiber 

Fiber with a core diameter less than about ten times the wavelength of the propagating light cannot be modeled using geometric optics. Instead, it must be analyzed as an electromagnetic waveguide structure, according to Maxwell's equations as reduced to the electromagnetic wave equation. As an optical waveguide, the fiber supports one or more confined transverse modes by which light can propagate along the fiber. Fiber supporting only one mode is called single-mode. The waveguide analysis shows that the light energy in the fiber is not completely confined in the core. Instead, especially in single-mode fibers, a significant fraction of the energy in the bound mode travels in the cladding as an evanescent wave. The most common type of single-mode fiber has a core diameter of 8–10 micrometers and is designed for use in the near infrared. Multi-mode fiber, by comparison, is manufactured with core diameters as small as 50 micrometers and as large as hundreds of micrometers.

Special-purpose fiber 
Some special-purpose optical fiber is constructed with a non-cylindrical core or cladding layer, usually with an elliptical or rectangular cross-section. These include polarization-maintaining fiber used in fiber optic sensors and fiber designed to suppress whispering gallery mode propagation.

Photonic-crystal fiber is made with a regular pattern of index variation (often in the form of cylindrical holes that run along the length of the fiber). Such fiber uses diffraction effects instead of or in addition to total internal reflection, to confine light to the fiber's core. The properties of the fiber can be tailored to a wide variety of applications.

Mechanisms of attenuation 

Attenuation in fiber optics, also known as transmission loss, is the reduction in the intensity of the light signal as it travels through the transmission medium. Attenuation coefficients in fiber optics are usually expressed in units of dB/km. The medium is usually a fiber of silica glass that confines the incident light beam within. Attenuation is an important factor limiting the transmission of a digital signal across large distances. Thus, much research has gone into both limiting the attenuation and maximizing the amplification of the optical signal. The four orders of magnitude reduction in the attenuation of silica optical fibers over four decades was the result of constant improvement of manufacturing processes, raw material purity, preform, and fiber designs, which allowed for these fibers to approach the theoretical lower limit of attenuation.  

Single-mode optical fibers can be made with extremely low loss. Corning's SMF-28 fiber, a standard single-mode fiber for telecommunications wavelengths, has a loss of 0.17 dB/km at 1550 nm. For example, an 8 km length of SMF-28 transmits nearly 75% of light at 1,550 nm.

Empirical research has shown that attenuation in optical fiber is caused primarily by both scattering and absorption.

Light scattering 

The propagation of light through the core of an optical fiber is based on the total internal reflection of the lightwave. Rough and irregular surfaces, even at the molecular level, can cause light rays to be reflected in random directions. This is called diffuse reflection or scattering, and it is typically characterized by a wide variety of reflection angles.

Scattering depends on the wavelength of the light being scattered. Thus, limits to spatial scales of visibility arise, depending on the frequency of the incident light wave and the physical dimension (or spatial scale) of the scattering center, which is typically in the form of some specific micro-structural feature. Since visible light has a wavelength of the order of one micrometer (one-millionth of a meter) scattering centers will have dimensions on a similar spatial scale.

Thus, attenuation results from the incoherent scattering of light at internal surfaces and interfaces. In (poly)crystalline materials such as metals and ceramics, in addition to pores, most of the internal surfaces or interfaces are in the form of grain boundaries that separate tiny regions of crystalline order. It has been shown that when the size of the scattering center (or grain boundary) is reduced below the size of the wavelength of the light being scattered, the scattering no longer occurs to any significant extent. This phenomenon has given rise to the production of transparent ceramic materials.

Similarly, the scattering of light in optical quality glass fiber is caused by molecular level irregularities (compositional fluctuations) in the glass structure. Indeed, one emerging school of thought is that glass is simply the limiting case of a polycrystalline solid. Within this framework, domains exhibiting various degrees of short-range order become the building blocks of metals as well as glasses and ceramics. Distributed both between and within these domains are micro-structural defects that provide the most ideal locations for light scattering. This same phenomenon is seen as one of the limiting factors in the transparency of IR missile domes.

At high optical powers, scattering can also be caused by nonlinear optical processes in the fiber.

UV-Vis-IR absorption 
In addition to light scattering, attenuation or signal loss can also occur due to selective absorption of specific wavelengths. Primary material considerations include both electrons and molecules as follows:
 At the electronic level, it depends on whether the electron orbitals are spaced (or "quantized") such that they can absorb a quantum of light (or photon) of a specific wavelength or frequency in the ultraviolet (UV) or visible ranges. This is what gives rise to color.
 At the atomic or molecular level, it depends on the frequencies of atomic or molecular vibrations or chemical bonds, how closely packed its atoms or molecules are, and whether or not the atoms or molecules exhibit long-range order. These factors will determine the capacity of the material to transmit longer wavelengths in the infrared (IR), far IR, radio, and microwave ranges.

The design of any optically transparent device requires the selection of materials based upon knowledge of its properties and limitations. The crystal structure absorption characteristics observed at the lower frequency regions (mid- to far-IR wavelength range) define the long-wavelength transparency limit of the material. They are the result of the interactive coupling between the motions of thermally induced vibrations of the constituent atoms and molecules of the solid lattice and the incident light wave radiation. Hence, all materials are bounded by limiting regions of absorption caused by atomic and molecular vibrations (bond-stretching) in the far-infrared (>10 µm).

In other words, the selective absorption of IR light by a particular material occurs because the selected frequency of the light wave matches the frequency (or an integer multiple of the frequency, i.e. harmonic) at which the particles of that material vibrate. Since different atoms and molecules have different natural frequencies of vibration, they will selectively absorb different frequencies (or portions of the spectrum) of IR light.

Reflection and transmission of light waves occur because the frequencies of the light waves do not match the natural resonant frequencies of vibration of the objects. When IR light of these frequencies strikes an object, the energy is either reflected or transmitted.

Loss budget 

Attenuation over a cable run is significantly increased by the inclusion of connectors and splices.  When computing the acceptable attenuation (loss budget) between a transmitter and a receiver one includes: 
 dB loss due to the type and length of fiber optic cable,
 dB loss introduced by connectors, and 
 dB loss introduced by splices.

Connectors typically introduce 0.3 dB per connector on well-polished connectors.  Splices typically introduce less than 0.2 dB per splice.

The total loss can be calculated by:
Loss = dB loss per connector × number of connectors + dB loss per splice × number of splices + dB loss per kilometer × kilometers of fiber,

where the dB loss per kilometer is a function of the type of fiber and can be found in the manufacturer's specifications.  For example, a typical 1550 nm single-mode fiber has a loss of 0.3 dB per kilometer.

The calculated loss budget is used when testing to confirm that the measured loss is within the normal operating parameters.

Manufacturing

Materials 
Glass optical fibers are almost always made from silica, but some other materials, such as fluorozirconate, fluoroaluminate, and chalcogenide glasses as well as crystalline materials like sapphire, are used for longer-wavelength infrared or other specialized applications. Silica and fluoride glasses usually have refractive indices of about 1.5, but some materials such as the chalcogenides can have indices as high as 3. Typically the index difference between core and cladding is less than one percent.

Plastic optical fibers (POF) are commonly step-index multi-mode fibers with a core diameter of 0.5 millimeters or larger. POF typically have higher attenuation coefficients than glass fibers, 1 dB/m or higher, and this high attenuation limits the range of POF-based systems.

Silica 
Silica exhibits fairly good optical transmission over a wide range of wavelengths. In the near-infrared (near IR) portion of the spectrum, particularly around 1.5 μm, silica can have extremely low absorption and scattering losses of the order of 0.2 dB/km. Such low losses depend on using ultra-pure silica. A high transparency in the 1.4-μm region is achieved by maintaining a low concentration of hydroxyl groups (OH). Alternatively, a high OH concentration is better for transmission in the ultraviolet (UV) region.

Silica can be drawn into fibers at reasonably high temperatures and has a fairly broad glass transformation range. One other advantage is that fusion splicing and cleaving of silica fibers is relatively effective. Silica fiber also has high mechanical strength against both pulling and even bending, provided that the fiber is not too thick and that the surfaces have been well prepared during processing. Even simple cleaving of the ends of the fiber can provide nicely flat surfaces with acceptable optical quality. Silica is also relatively chemically inert. In particular, it is not hygroscopic (does not absorb water).

Silica glass can be doped with various materials. One purpose of doping is to raise the refractive index (e.g. with germanium dioxide (GeO2) or aluminium oxide (Al2O3)) or to lower it (e.g. with fluorine or boron trioxide (B2O3)). Doping is also possible with laser-active ions (for example, rare-earth-doped fibers) in order to obtain active fibers to be used, for example, in fiber amplifiers or laser applications. Both the fiber core and cladding are typically doped, so that the entire assembly (core and cladding) is effectively the same compound (e.g. an aluminosilicate, germanosilicate, phosphosilicate or borosilicate glass).

Particularly for active fibers, pure silica is usually not a very suitable host glass, because it exhibits a low solubility for rare-earth ions. This can lead to quenching effects due to the clustering of dopant ions. Aluminosilicates are much more effective in this respect.

Silica fiber also exhibits a high threshold for optical damage. This property ensures a low tendency for laser-induced breakdown. This is important for fiber amplifiers when utilized for the amplification of short pulses.

Because of these properties, silica fibers are the material of choice in many optical applications, such as communications (except for very short distances with plastic optical fiber), fiber lasers, fiber amplifiers, and fiber-optic sensors. Large efforts put forth in the development of various types of silica fibers have further increased the performance of such fibers over other materials.

Fluoride glass 
Fluoride glass is a class of non-oxide optical quality glasses composed of fluorides of various metals. Because of the low viscosity of these glasses, it is very difficult to completely avoid crystallization while processing it through the glass transition (or drawing the fiber from the melt). Thus, although heavy metal fluoride glasses (HMFG) exhibit very low optical attenuation, they are not only difficult to manufacture, but are quite fragile, and have poor resistance to moisture and other environmental attacks. Their best attribute is that they lack the absorption band associated with the hydroxyl (OH) group (3,200–3,600 cm−1; i.e., 2,777–3,125 nm or 2.78–3.13 μm), which is present in nearly all oxide-based glasses. Such low losses were never realized in practice, and the fragility and high cost of fluoride fibers made them less than ideal as primary candidates. 

Fluoride fibers are used in mid-IR spectroscopy, fiber optic sensors, thermometry, and imaging. Fluoride fibers can be used for guided lightwave transmission in media such as YAG (yttrium aluminium garnet) lasers at 2.9 μm, as required for medical applications (e.g. ophthalmology and dentistry).

An example of a heavy metal fluoride glass is the ZBLAN glass group, composed of zirconium, barium, lanthanum, aluminium, and sodium fluorides. Their main technological application is as optical waveguides in both planar and fiber forms. They are advantageous especially in the mid-infrared (2,000–5,000 nm) range.

Phosphate glass 

Phosphate glass is a class of optical glasses composed of metaphosphates of various metals. Instead of the SiO4  tetrahedra observed in silicate glasses, the building block for this glass phosphorus pentoxide (P2O5), which crystallizes in at least four different forms. The most familiar polymorph is the cagelike structure of P4O10.

Phosphate glasses can be advantageous over silica glasses for optical fibers with a high concentration of doping rare-earth ions. A mix of fluoride glass and phosphate glass is fluorophosphate glass.

Chalcogenide glass 
The chalcogens—the elements in group 16 of the periodic table—particularly sulfur (S), selenium (Se) and tellurium (Te)—react with more electropositive elements, such as silver, to form chalcogenides. These are extremely versatile compounds, in that they can be crystalline or amorphous, metallic or semiconducting, and conductors of ions or electrons. Glass containing chalcogenides can be used to make fibers for far infrared transmission.

Process

Preform 

Standard optical fibers are made by first constructing a large-diameter "preform" with a carefully controlled refractive index profile, and then "pulling" the preform to form the long, thin optical fiber. The preform is commonly made by three chemical vapor deposition methods: inside vapor deposition, outside vapor deposition, and vapor axial deposition.

Gases such as silicon tetrachloride (SiCl4) or germanium tetrachloride (GeCl4) are injected with oxygen in the end of the tube. The gases are then heated by means of an external hydrogen burner, bringing the temperature of the gas up to 1,900 K (1,600 °C, 3,000 °F), where the tetrachlorides react with oxygen to produce silica or germania (germanium dioxide) particles. When the reaction conditions are chosen to allow this reaction to occur in the gas phase throughout the tube volume, in contrast to earlier techniques where the reaction occurred only on the glass surface, this technique is called modified chemical vapor deposition (MCVD).

The oxide particles then agglomerate to form large particle chains, which subsequently deposit on the walls of the tube as soot. The deposition is due to the large difference in temperature between the gas core and the wall causing the gas to push the particles outward (this is known as thermophoresis). The torch is then traversed up and down the length of the tube to deposit the material evenly. After the torch has reached the end of the tube, it is then brought back to the beginning of the tube and the deposited particles are then melted to form a solid layer. This process is repeated until a sufficient amount of material has been deposited. For each layer the composition can be modified by varying the gas composition, resulting in precise control of the finished fiber's optical properties.

In outside vapor deposition or vapor axial deposition, the glass is formed by flame hydrolysis, a reaction in which silicon tetrachloride and germanium tetrachloride are oxidized by reaction with water (H2O) in an oxyhydrogen flame. In outside vapor deposition, the glass is deposited onto a solid rod, which is removed before further processing. In vapor axial deposition, a short seed rod is used, and a porous preform, whose length is not limited by the size of the source rod, is built up on its end. The porous preform is consolidated into a transparent, solid preform by heating to about 1,800 K (1,500 °C, 2,800 °F).

Typical communications fiber uses a circular preform. For some applications such as double-clad fibers another form is preferred. In fiber lasers based on double-clad fiber, an asymmetric shape improves the filling factor for laser pumping.

Because of the surface tension, the shape is smoothed during the drawing process, and the shape of the resulting fiber does not reproduce the sharp edges of the preform. Nevertheless, careful polishing of the preform is important, since any defects of the preform surface affect the optical and mechanical properties of the resulting fiber. In particular, the preform for the test fiber shown in the figure was not polished well, and cracks are seen with the confocal optical microscope.

Drawing 
The preform, regardless of construction, is placed in a device known as a drawing tower, where the preform tip is heated and the optical fiber is pulled out as a string. By measuring the resultant fiber width, the tension on the fiber can be controlled to maintain the fiber thickness.

Coatings 
The light is guided down the core of the fiber by an optical cladding with a lower refractive index that traps light in the core through total internal reflection.

The cladding is coated by a buffer that protects it from moisture and physical damage. The buffer coating is what gets stripped off the fiber for termination or splicing. These coatings are UV-cured urethane acrylate composite or polyimide materials applied to the outside of the fiber during the drawing process. The coatings protect the very delicate strands of glass fiber—about the size of a human hair—and allow it to survive the rigors of manufacturing, proof testing, cabling, and installation.

Today’s glass optical fiber draw processes employ a dual-layer coating approach. An inner primary coating is designed to act as a shock absorber to minimize attenuation caused by microbending. An outer secondary coating protects the primary coating against mechanical damage and acts as a barrier to lateral forces, and may be colored to differentiate strands in bundled cable constructions.

These fiber optic coating layers are applied during the fiber draw, at speeds approaching . Fiber optic coatings are applied using one of two methods: wet-on-dry and wet-on-wet. In wet-on-dry, the fiber passes through a primary coating application, which is then UV cured—then through the secondary coating application, which is subsequently cured. In wet-on-wet, the fiber passes through both the primary and secondary coating applications, then goes to UV curing.

Fiber optic coatings are applied in concentric layers to prevent damage to the fiber during the drawing application and to maximize fiber strength and microbend resistance. Unevenly coated fiber will experience non-uniform forces when the coating expands or contracts and is susceptible to greater signal attenuation. Under proper drawing and coating processes, the coatings are concentric around the fiber, continuous over the length of the application, and have a constant thickness.

The thickness of the coating is taken into account when calculating the stress that the fiber experiences under different bend configurations. When a coated fiber is wrapped around a mandrel, the stress experienced by the fiber is given by

,

In a two-point bend configuration, a coated fiber is bent in a U-shape and placed between the grooves of two faceplates, which are brought together until the fiber breaks. The stress in the fiber in this configuration is given by

,

where  is the distance between the faceplates. The coefficient 1.198 is a geometric constant associated with this configuration.

Fiber optic coatings protect the glass fibers from scratches that could lead to strength degradation. The combination of moisture and scratches accelerates the aging and deterioration of fiber strength. When fiber is subjected to low stresses over a long period, fiber fatigue can occur. Over time or in extreme conditions, these factors combine to cause microscopic flaws in the glass fiber to propagate, which can ultimately result in fiber failure.

Three key characteristics of fiber optic waveguides can be affected by environmental conditions: strength, attenuation, and resistance to losses caused by microbending. External optical fiber cable jackets and buffer tubes protect glass optical fiber from environmental conditions that can affect the fiber’s performance and long-term durability. On the inside, coatings ensure the reliability of the signal being carried and help minimize attenuation due to microbending.

Cable construction 

In practical fibers, the cladding is usually coated with a tough resin coating and an additional buffer layer, which may be further surrounded by a jacket layer, usually plastic. These layers add strength to the fiber but do not contribute to its optical wave guide properties. Rigid fiber assemblies sometimes put light-absorbing ("dark") glass between the fibers, to prevent light that leaks out of one fiber from entering another. This reduces crosstalk between the fibers, or reduces flare in fiber bundle imaging applications.

Modern cables come in a wide variety of sheathings and armor, designed for applications such as direct burial in trenches, high voltage isolation, dual use as power lines, installation in conduit, lashing to aerial telephone poles, submarine installation, and insertion in paved streets. Multi-fiber cable usually uses colored coatings and/or buffers to identify each strand. The cost of small fiber-count pole-mounted cables has greatly decreased due to the high demand for fiber to the home (FTTH) installations in Japan and South Korea.

Some fiber optic cable versions are reinforced with aramid yarns or glass yarns as an intermediary strength member. In commercial terms, usage of the glass yarns are more cost-effective while no loss in mechanical durability of the cable. Glass yarns also protect the cable core against rodents and termites.

Practical issues

Installation 
Fiber cable can be very flexible, but traditional fiber's loss increases greatly if the fiber is bent with a radius smaller than around 30 mm. This creates a problem when the cable is bent around corners or wound around a spool, making FTTX installations more complicated. "Bendable fibers", targeted toward easier installation in home environments, have been standardized as ITU-T G.657. This type of fiber can be bent with a radius as low as 7.5 mm without adverse impact. Even more bendable fibers have been developed. Bendable fiber may also be resistant to fiber hacking, in which the signal in a fiber is surreptitiously monitored by bending the fiber and detecting the leakage.

Another important feature of cable is cable's ability to withstand horizontally applied force. It is technically called max tensile strength defining how much force can be applied to the cable during the installation period.

Termination and splicing 

Optical fibers are connected to terminal equipment by optical fiber connectors. These connectors are usually of a standard type such as FC, SC, ST, LC, MTRJ, MPO or SMA. Optical fibers may be connected by connectors, or permanently by splicing, that is, joining two fibers together to form a continuous optical waveguide. The generally accepted splicing method is arc fusion splicing, which melts the fiber ends together with an electric arc. For quicker fastening jobs, a “mechanical splice” is used.

Fusion splicing is done with a specialized instrument. The fiber ends are first stripped of their protective polymer coating (as well as the more sturdy outer jacket, if present). The ends are cleaved (cut) with a precision cleaver to make them perpendicular, and are placed into special holders in the fusion splicer. The splice is usually inspected via a magnified viewing screen to check the cleaves before and after the splice. The splicer uses small motors to align the end faces together, and emits a small spark between electrodes at the gap to burn off dust and moisture. Then the splicer generates a larger spark that raises the temperature above the melting point of the glass, fusing the ends permanently. The location and energy of the spark is carefully controlled so that the molten core and cladding do not mix, and this minimizes optical loss. A splice loss estimate is measured by the splicer, by directing light through the cladding on one side and measuring the light leaking from the cladding on the other side. A splice loss under 0.1 dB is typical. The complexity of this process makes fiber splicing much more difficult than splicing copper wire.

Mechanical fiber splices are designed to be quicker and easier to install, but there is still the need for stripping, careful cleaning, and precision cleaving. The fiber ends are aligned and held together by a precision-made sleeve, often using a clear index-matching gel that enhances the transmission of light across the joint. Such joints typically have a higher optical loss and are less robust than fusion splices, especially if the gel is used. All splicing techniques involve installing an enclosure that protects the splice.

Fibers are terminated in connectors that hold the fiber end precisely and securely. A fiber-optic connector is a rigid cylindrical barrel surrounded by a sleeve that holds the barrel in its mating socket. The mating mechanism can be push and click, turn and latch (bayonet mount), or screw-in (threaded). The barrel is typically free to move within the sleeve and may have a key that prevents the barrel and fiber from rotating as the connectors are mated.

A typical connector is installed by preparing the fiber end and inserting it into the rear of the connector body. Quick-set adhesive is usually used to hold the fiber securely, and a strain relief is secured to the rear. Once the adhesive sets, the fiber's end is polished to a mirror finish. Various polish profiles are used, depending on the type of fiber and the application. For single-mode fiber, fiber ends are typically polished with a slight curvature that makes the mated connectors touch only at their cores. This is called a physical contact (PC) polish. The curved surface may be polished at an angle, to make an angled physical contact (APC) connection. Such connections have higher loss than PC connections but greatly reduced back reflection, because light that reflects from the angled surface leaks out of the fiber core. The resulting signal strength loss is called gap loss. APC fiber ends have low back reflection even when disconnected.

In the 1990s, terminating fiber optic cables was labor-intensive. The number of parts per connector, polishing of the fibers, and the need to oven-bake the epoxy in each connector made terminating fiber optic cables difficult. Today, many connector types are on the market that offer easier, less labor-intensive ways of terminating cables. Some of the most popular connectors are pre-polished at the factory and include a gel inside the connector. Those two steps help save money on labor, especially on large projects. A cleave is made at a required length, to get as close to the polished piece already inside the connector. The gel surrounds the point where the two pieces meet inside the connector for very little light loss. Long-term performance of the gel is a design consideration, so for the most demanding installations, factory pre-polished pigtails of sufficient length to reach the first fusion splice enclosure is normally the safest approach that minimizes on-site labor.

Free-space coupling 
It is often necessary to align an optical fiber with another optical fiber or with an optoelectronic device such as a light-emitting diode, a laser diode, or a modulator. This can involve either carefully aligning the fiber and placing it in contact with the device, or can use a lens to allow coupling over an air gap. Typically the size of the fiber mode is much larger than the size of the mode in a laser diode or a silicon optical chip. In this case, a tapered or lensed fiber is used to match the fiber mode field distribution to that of the other element. The lens on the end of the fiber can be formed using polishing, laser cutting or fusion splicing.

In a laboratory environment, a bare fiber end is coupled using a fiber launch system, which uses a microscope objective lens to focus the light down to a fine point. A precision translation stage (micro-positioning table) is used to move the lens, fiber, or device to allow the coupling efficiency to be optimized. Fibers with a connector on the end make this process much simpler: the connector is simply plugged into a pre-aligned fiber-optic collimator, which contains a lens that is either accurately positioned to the fiber or is adjustable. To achieve the best injection efficiency into a single-mode fiber, the direction, position, size, and divergence of the beam must all be optimized. With good beams, 70 to 90% coupling efficiency can be achieved.

With properly polished single-mode fibers, the emitted beam has an almost perfect Gaussian shape—even in the far field—if a good lens is used. The lens needs to be large enough to support the full numerical aperture of the fiber, and must not introduce aberrations in the beam. Aspheric lenses are typically used.

Fiber fuse 
At high optical intensities, above 2 megawatts per square centimeter, when a fiber is subjected to a shock or is otherwise suddenly damaged, a fiber fuse can occur. The reflection from the damage vaporizes the fiber immediately before the break, and this new defect remains reflective so that the damage propagates back toward the transmitter at 1–3 meters per second (4–11 km/h, 2–8 mph). The open fiber control system, which ensures laser eye safety in the event of a broken fiber, can also effectively halt propagation of the fiber fuse. In situations, such as undersea cables, where high power levels might be used without the need for open fiber control, a "fiber fuse" protection device at the transmitter can break the circuit to keep damage to a minimum.

Chromatic dispersion 

The refractive index of fibers varies slightly with the frequency of light, and light sources are not perfectly monochromatic. Modulation of the light source to transmit a signal also slightly widens the frequency band of the transmitted light. This has the effect that, over long distances and at high modulation speeds, the different frequencies of light can take different times to arrive at the receiver, ultimately making the signal impossible to discern, and requiring extra repeaters. This problem can be overcome in several ways, including the use of a relatively short length of fiber that has the opposite refractive index gradient.

See also 

 Fiber Bragg grating
 Fiber management system
 The Fiber Optic Association
 Gradient-index optics
 Interconnect bottleneck
 Leaky mode
 Li-Fi
 Light tube
 Modal bandwidth
 Optical communication
 Optical mesh network
 Optical power meter
 Radiation effects on optical fibers
 Return loss
 Subwavelength-diameter optical fibre

Notes

References

Further reading 

 
 
 Mirabito, Michael M. A.; and Morgenstern, Barbara L., The New Communications Technologies: Applications, Policy, and Impact, 5th Edition. Focal Press, 2004..
 Mitschke F., Fiber Optics: Physics and Technology, Springer, 2009
 
 
 Lennie Lightwave's Guide to Fiber Optics, The Fiber Optic Association, 2016.
  The book discusses how fiber optics has contributed to globalization, and has revolutionized communications, business, and even the distribution of capital among countries.
 GR-771, Generic Requirements for Fiber Optic Splice Closures, Telcordia Technologies, Issue 2, July 2008. Discusses fiber optic splice closures and the associated hardware intended to restore the mechanical and environmental integrity of one or more fiber cables entering the enclosure.

External links 

 The Fiber Optic Association
 "Fibers", article in RP Photonics' Encyclopedia of Laser Physics and Technology
 "Fibre optic technologies", Mercury Communications Ltd, August 1992.
 "Photonics & the future of fibre", Mercury Communications Ltd, March 1993.
 "Fiber Optic Tutorial" Educational site from Arc Electronics
 MIT Video Lecture: Understanding Lasers and Fiberoptics
 Fundamentals of Photonics: Module on Optical Waveguides and Fibers
 Webdemo for chromatic dispersion at the Institute of Telecommunicatons, University of Stuttgart

 
 
Articles containing video clips
Glass engineering and science
Glass production
Telecommunications equipment